Gia Maisha Hamilton (born July 30, 1978) is a contemporary curator and culture worker with focus on afro-futurism and community engagement. She serves as executive director and chief curator of the New Orleans African American Museum.

Early life and education
Hamilton was born in New Orleans, Louisiana. Her father is a retired nuclear engineer.

Hamilton received a bachelor's degree in cultural anthropology from New York University and a Master's of applied anthropology from City University of New York.

Career
In 2011 Hamilton curated The Invisible Man Exhibit at The George & Leah McKenna Museum of African American Art through her Gris Gris Lab project for Prospect 2, a meeting place and think tank for local cultural workers to work together which she launched in 2009 in New Orleans. The show referenced Ralph Ellison's novel and highlighted local contemporary black male artists.

After 15 years in Brooklyn and her work on Prospect 2, New Orleans, Hamilton moved back to New Orleans full-time. There she opened Gris Gris Lab, a meeting place and think tank for local cultural workers to work together.

In 2013 Hamilton became the Director of the Joan Mitchell Center where she spearheaded the creation of their New Orleans twelve million dollar campus development of an artists' residency program, cultural initiatives and investment in the local arts community. The residency program uniquely hosts international emerging, mid-career and established artists alongside local emerging artists that fosters a dialogue about their work on an international platform. The campus provides an oasis for artists while maintaining a central location and access to New Orleans. She was able to bring trust and criticality to the project as well as knowledge of native New Orleanean art, "ethnographic assessment and organizational design."

Hamilton was invited by Ace Hotel to curate Southern Parlour Exhibition, that created a new space for cultural exchange and dialogue about blackness in contemporary art for both artists and visitors. Southern Parlour was one of four salons Ace Hotel hosted and one of Hamilton's goals was to examine the multiple perspectives contemporary work by black artists offers. This exhibition was hosted by Hamilton's project, Afrofuture Society, which is a global-thinking cultural and social New Orlean's based group that explores alternatives to dominant culture.

Hamilton moderated a panel for Prospect 3 on political and social responsibility of art institutions and artists. The panel included Brandan Odums of ExhibitBE, Imani Jacqueline Brown and Lisa Sigal of Blights Out, Willie Birch, and Nari Ward.

Hamilton was one of four curators to revive the Atlanta Biennial at the Atlanta Contemporary in 2016 featuring a Southern perspective on the contemporary art survey show. The show examined connections between artists across the Southeast instead of focusing on artists in the Atlanta metro area. Notable artists featured in this exhibition include William Downs, Stacy Lynn Waddell, Kalup Linzy and Harmony Korine.

As part of Savannah College of Art and Design's initiative for bringing international creatives in to dialogue with SCAD students, Hamilton led a discussion with artists Lavar Monroe, Robin Rhode and the design group R & R Studios at SCAD Museum of Art in 2016.

In 2018, Hamilton received a Next City Vanguard fellowship. She partnered with Airbnb to host a Modern Matriarch tour, which focuses on women of color in New Orleans' 7th ward.

Hamilton has written for Huffington Post and Pelican Bomb about maintaining a healthy lifestyle as a culture worker and single mother of four boys.

Hamilton has been on the board of Tulane University's Newcomb Museum, Alliance for Artist Communities, and New Orleans Video Access Center. She has also been featured in curatorial intensives with Independent Curators International.

Since 2019 Hamilton has reopened the New Orleans African American Museum and has been serving as its executive director and chief curator.

Family 
Hamilton has four sons and lives in New Orleans.

Recognitions 
In 2018 Hamilton received the Next City Vanguard fellowship.

In 2018 Hamilton was nominated for the Business Woman of Year award.

References

External links
 
 Gris Gris Lab
 Afrofuture Society

1978 births
New York University alumni
City University of New York alumni
American curators
American women curators
Living people
American arts administrators
Women arts administrators
African-American curators
21st-century African-American people
21st-century African-American women
20th-century African-American people
20th-century African-American women